The 17687/17688 Marathwada Express is an Express that connects Manmad and Dharmabad. It is also known as the High Court Express. During its journey, it connects many important places in Marathwada such as Aurangabad, Jalna, Parbhani and Nanded.

Schedule 
17688 UP Marathwada Express departs  at 04:00 IST and reaches  at 13:10 IST. 17687 DOWN Marathwada Express departs Manmad Junction at 15:00 IST and reaches Dharmabad at 23:50 IST. The train covers a distance of 419 km between Manmad Junction and Dharmabad.

Etymology 
The train connects almost all the major cities of Marathwada, hence its name Marathwada Express.
People from Nanded and Parbhani districts use the train to attend sessions of the Mumbai High Court bench situated at Aurangabad, hence the train got its nickname as High Court Express. It is also known as "Manmad–Dharmabad Composite Express", since it runs as an express train between Dharmabad and Aurangabad and as a passenger train between Aurangabad and Manmad.

Route & Halts

Traction
As the entire route is undergoing electrification both train are hauled by a Pune / Guntakal-based WDM-3A locomotive from Manmad to Dharmabad, and vice versa.

Rake sharing
The train shares its rake with 17617/17618 Tapovan Express.

References

External links
 http://www.irfca.org/faq/faq-name.html
 http://indian-railway.swargate.com/Train-Time-Table/Manmad-Dharmabad-Composite-Express/17687/

Transport in Manmad
Named passenger trains of India
Transport in Aurangabad, Maharashtra
Rail transport in Maharashtra
Express trains in India